The Mayor of Holyoke is the head of the executive branch of the municipal government of Holyoke, Massachusetts responsible for presenting an initial budget to the city council, and appointing key office holders such as the chief of police and fire commissioners.

Although members of both major parties have successfully run for office since the city's incorporation, elections for municipal positions are officially nonpartisan, on the ballot candidates do not run as members of any political party, nor require backing of one in any official capacity.

When Holyoke was incorporated as a city, initially the mayoral term given in the 1874 charter was for the mayor to serve a single-year term, being elected at the end of the municipal year. This was subsequently raised to two years during the mayoralty of William P. Yoerg in 1936, and from two to four years during that of Alex B. Morse in 2015. Mayoral primaries, in which the two candidates receiving the most votes went on to run in the election, began in 1959. Oftentimes mayoral administrations and mayors themselves are referred to interchangeably with the office space that each has occupied since the city's incorporation, "Room One".

Since Holyoke's establishment as a City in 1873, the following individuals have served as its mayor-

Notes

References

Holyoke